Horsfieldia ampla is a small (4–5 m tall) rare tree with small (4×2 mm) yellow flowers in the family Myristicaceae, known only from its type collection (the original type specimen used to describe it has been lost).  It is endemic to Papua New Guinea, where it is only found in those provinces associated with the Sepik river (East Sepik and Sandaun, together formerly known as Sepik Province), growing in dense humid forest.

References

Further reading
de Wilde, W.J.J.O. 1985. "A new account of the genus Horsfieldia (Myristicaceae)". Pt. 2. Gardens' Bulletin 38(1): 55–144.

Flora of Papua New Guinea
ampla
Vulnerable plants
Taxonomy articles created by Polbot